Matthew Elwin Bell (born August 31, 1985) is a professional race car driver. Bell was born in Mountain View, California. Although Bell grew up in Los Altos, California, he attended Mountain View High School from which he graduated in 2004. After graduation, he pursued  transportation design at the Academy of Art University, San Francisco, California. Shortly after his third year of attendance, Bell joined Grand America Road Racing Association Koni Challenge Series in 2008 and raced with Turner Motorsport. For two years he raced for Turner Motorsport. Bell is racing for Stevenson Motorsport in the 2010 No. 6 Sunoco Camaro. Bell resides in San Mateo, California and when not racing is an instructor at Jim Russell Racing School.

Racing career
In 2012, Bell made his debut in NASCAR competition, driving the No. 4 Chevrolet in the Nationwide Series for JD Motorsports at Road America. Five years later, Bell returned to the series – now the Xfinity Series – at Mid-Ohio Sports Car Course, where he drove the No. 90 for King Autosport. His car suffered from brake issues and he violently crashed into the tire barrier in turn one; he finished 38th.

Images

Motorsports career results

NASCAR
(key) (Bold – Pole position awarded by qualifying time. Italics – Pole position earned by points standings or practice time. * – Most laps led.)

Xfinity Series

Sports car racing
(key) Bold – pole position (overall finish/class finish).

Continental Tire Sports Car Challenge

Rolex Sports Car Series

American Le Mans Series

Complete WeatherTech SportsCar Championship results
(key) (Races in bold indicate pole position; results in italics indicate fastest lap)

References

External links
 
 

Living people
1985 births
People from Mountain View, California
Racing drivers from California
Racing drivers from San Jose, California
24 Hours of Daytona drivers
American Le Mans Series drivers
Rolex Sports Car Series drivers
NASCAR drivers
WeatherTech SportsCar Championship drivers
Academy of Art University alumni
Mountain View High School alumni
Meyer Shank Racing drivers
Michelin Pilot Challenge drivers